Paremhat, also known as Phamenoth (Phamenṓth) and Baramhat, is the seventh month of the ancient Egyptian and Coptic calendars. It lies between March 10 and April 8 of the Gregorian calendar. Paremhat is also the third month of the Season of the Emergence, when the Nile floods recede and the crops start to grow throughout the land of Egypt.

Name
The Coptic name Paremhat comes from the ancient Egyptian name "Month of Amenhotep I", who was deified at the end of his reign BC. The month had formerly been known as Rekeh-Nedjes.

Coptic Synaxarium of the month of Paremhat

References

Citations

Bibliography
 Coptic Synaxarium of the month of Baramhat

Months of the Coptic calendar
Egyptian calendar